Daniel Charles "Snowshoes" Maloney (September 24, 1950 – November 19, 2018) was a professional ice hockey left winger in the National Hockey League (NHL) and NHL coach. He featured in the 1971 Stanley Cup Finals with the Chicago Blackhawks.

Playing career
Drafted 14th overall by the Chicago Black Hawks in the 1970 NHL Entry Draft, Maloney played two seasons for the Black Hawks and later played for the Los Angeles Kings, Detroit Red Wings and Toronto Maple Leafs tallying 192 goals, 259 assists and 451 points in 737 games over the course of his playing career. Upon retiring as a player he was offered an assistant coach position with the Maple Leafs in 1982, and promoted to head coach in 1984. He coached two seasons with the Leafs, then coached three more years as head coach of the Winnipeg Jets.

Maloney is known as having had one of the hardest right-hand punches in his day, and is considered by many hockey fans to have been the greatest fighter (along with the Flyers' Dave Schultz) in NHL history. The two finally squared off in a fight in a game in Los Angeles on January 4, 1975, with Maloney considered the winner. But Maloney was more than a fighter, as he tallied 27 goals in back to back seasons (1974–75 and 1975–76). Maloney was part of the trade that sent Marcel Dionne from Detroit to the Los Angeles Kings. Schultz was traded to the Kings a year later to replace Maloney as their enforcer. 

As a member of the Red Wings, he was the third NHL player to be charged by local authorities with a crime resulting from action on the ice. In the second period of a 7–3 loss to Toronto at Maple Leaf Gardens on November 5, 1975, Maloney came to the defense of teammate Bryan Hextall by attacking the Maple Leafs' Brian Glennie from behind, flattening him with a right‐hand punch, hitting him several more times and repeatedly lifting and dropping him, face first, to the ice. Glennie sustained a mild concussion. Despite Glennie's hit on Hextall being described by The Associated Press as "a clean check," Maloney claimed the force of the contact was excessive and that he had no intention of injuring him. He was charged with assault by Attorney General of Ontario Roy McMurtry the following day on November 6, but was acquitted just under eight months later on June 30, 1976.

Personal life
During his time with the Red Wings, Maloney lived year-round in Detroit area (Southfield, Michigan). Maloney's nephew, Trenton Bourque, was drafted by the St. Louis Blues in 2017.

In his later years Maloney lived in the Barrie or Orillia, Ontario area. Maloney died on November 19, 2018 after a period of declining health; he was 68.

Career statistics

Coaching record

References

External links

1950 births
2018 deaths
Canadian ice hockey left wingers
Chicago Blackhawks draft picks
Chicago Blackhawks players
Detroit Red Wings captains
Detroit Red Wings players
Ice hockey people from Simcoe County
London Knights players
Los Angeles Kings players
National Hockey League first-round draft picks
New York Rangers coaches
Sportspeople from Barrie
Toronto Maple Leafs coaches
Toronto Maple Leafs players
Winnipeg Jets (1972–1996) coaches
Canadian ice hockey coaches